Staroye Selo is a rural locality (a village) in Zheleznodorozhnoye Rural Settlement, Sheksninsky District, Vologda Oblast, Russia. The population was 11 as of 2002.

Geography 
Staroye Selo is located 23 km west of Sheksna (the district's administrative centre) by road. Gorka is the nearest rural locality.

References 

Rural localities in Sheksninsky District